Phyllium elegans is a species of insect in the family Phylliidae. It is endemic to New Guinea.

Taxonomy 
It was described in 1991 on the basis of a female holotype from Papua New Guinea. The holotype is currently stored in the Bavarian State Collection of Zoology.

References 

Insects of New Guinea
Phylliidae
Insects described in 1991